The 1899 Maryland gubernatorial election took place on November 7, 1899.

Incumbent Governor Republican Lloyd Lowndes Jr. was defeated by Democratic candidate John Walter Smith.

General election

Candidates
Lloyd Lowndes Jr., Republican, incumbent Governor
John Walter Smith, Democratic, incumbent U.S. Congressman
William Nevin Hill, Union Reform, physician
Levin Thomas Jones, Social Democrat
John A. Rugemer, Socialist Labor
James Swann, Prohibition, Prohibition candidate for Maryland's 1st congressional district in 1898

Results

References

Gubernatorial
1899
Maryland